Sandy Hook is an unincorporated community in Daviess County, Indiana, in the United States.

History
When Sandy Hook contained a post office it was spelled Sandyhook. It opened in 1899, and closed the next year, in 1900.

References

Unincorporated communities in Daviess County, Indiana
Unincorporated communities in Indiana